Powdermill Run is a  long 2nd order tributary to White Oak Run in Westmoreland County, Pennsylvania.  This stream passes through the Powdermill Nature Preserve of the Carnegie Museum.

Variant names
According to the Geographic Names Information System, it has also been known historically as: 
 Powder Mill Creek
 Powder Mill Run
 Powdermill Creek
 Tributary No.1 to White Oak Run

Course
Powdermill Run rises on the Linn Run/Clear Run divide about 1 mile west of Bald Knob in Westmoreland County.  Powdermill Run then flows northwest to meet White Oak Run about 0.25 miles southwest of Weaver Mill, Pennsylvania.

Watershed
Powdermill Run drains  of area, receives about 52.1 in/year of precipitation, has a topographic wetness index of 359.94, and has an average water temperature of 8.58 °C.  The watershed is 99% forested.

Additional Images

References

Rivers of Westmoreland County, Pennsylvania
Rivers of Pennsylvania